Ottayaal paatha (The Narrow Path) is a Malayalam feature film directed by Satish Babusenan and Santosh Babusenan. The film won the Silver Gateway, the award for the second best film, at the 18th Jio MAMI Mumbai Film Festival held in October 2016. Ottayaal Paatha was the only Malayalam film screened in the Mumbai festival. The film was also adjudged as the Second Best Film by the jury of the 47th Kerala State Film Awards announced in January 2017. It won the John Abraham Award for Best Malayalam Film in 2016. It was the only Indian movie selected to the competition section of the Cairo International Film Festival held in Cairo in November 2016. The Cairo International Film Festival is the oldest film festival in Africa and the Arab World and is among the 15 A-list competitive film festivals in the world.

References

2010s Malayalam-language films